CJXX-FM is a Canadian radio station, broadcasting at 93.1 FM in Grande Prairie, Alberta. Owned by the Jim Pattison Group, the station is branded as Big Country 93.1 and broadcasts a country format.

The station originally began broadcasting on 1430 kHz (AM) on December 16, 1979, received approval to move to 840 AM in 1991  and then to its current FM frequency in November 2000.

References

External links
Big Country 93.1
 

JXX
JXX
JXX
Radio stations established in 1979
1979 establishments in Alberta